Thompo Icefall is an icefall at the northeast edge of Saratoga Table between Mount Hummer and Mount Hook, in the Forrestal Range, Pensacola Mountains, Antarctica. Mapped by United States Geological Survey (USGS) in 1967 from ground surveys and U.S. Navy aerial photographs taken in 1964. Named by Advisory Committee on Antarctic Names (US-ACAN) in 1979 after Robert W. Thompson, photographer of U.S. Navy Squadron VX-6 in the Balleny Islands and Sky-Hi Nunataks areas, 1963–64, and in the Pensacola Mountains, 1964–65. Thompo is a nickname by which he and other family members have been known.

Icefalls of Antarctica
Bodies of ice of Queen Elizabeth Land